Bougouni is a commune and city in Mali, the administrative center of Bougouni Cercle, which is in turn found in the administrative region of Sikasso.  Bougouni is located  170 km south of Bamako and 210 km west of the city of Sikasso.  It covers an area of 7 square kilometres and as at the 2009 Census the commune had a population of 59,679, mostly Fulas and Bambaras.

History
Bougouni was the fourteenth commune created by the French colonial authorities of French Sudan.  On July 10, 1894, Bougouni became the administrative center of the commune under its first administrator, Lieutenant Gouraud.  Bougouni held an important set of colonial archives which were lost in a fire during the March 1991 uprising against President Moussa Traoré.

Geography
Bougouni, like many cities of  Mali, enjoys sufficient rainfall for regular farming. Cotton is produced in the region around the town, making it a center for processing and transport.  The Bougouni-Foulaboula Protected Forest (Forêt Classée de Bougouni-Foulaboula) begins just to the southwest of the town.

Bougouni has been a sister city of Aurillac, France, since 1985.

The Cercle of Bougouni includes the communes of Bladié-Tiemela, Bougouni, Chantoula, Danou, Debelin, Defina, Dogo, Domba, Faradielé, Faragouaran, Garolo, Keleya, Kokelé, Kola, Koumantou, Kouroulamini, Meridiela, Ouroun, Sanso, Sibirila, Sido, Tiémala-Banimonotié, Wola, Yinindougou, Yiridougou and Zantiebougou, for a total population of 251,987.

Climate
Bougouni has a tropical savanna climate (Köppen climate classification: Aw).

See also 
 List of cities in Mali
 Mali Empire

References

Bougouni, Mali, Falling Rain.
This article is based on a translation of the corresponding article from the French Wikipedia, retrieved on June 30, 2005.
Cheich Abd El Kader Bougouni, ma ville natale ! , 1999-2008 - Afribone Mali SA.
"Mother and Child [Mali, Bougouni or Dioila area; Bamana peoples (1979.206.121)". In Timeline of Art History. New York: The Metropolitan Museum of Art, 2000–.  (October 2006).
Bougouni Mosque: ArchNet listing.
Geographic features & Photographs around Forêt Classée de Bougouni-Foulaboula, in Mali.
Bougouni Village Raw Cotton, Alibaba.com company profile.
Bougouni Cercle listings, African Development Information Services database.
Action Santé et Education pour Bougouni - ASEB, Bougouni based health services cooperative/ngo, 2006.
1957 area map of Bougouni Cercle, US Army.

Populated places in Sikasso Region
French West Africa